Cerbalus aravaensis is a huntsman spider found in the southern Arava Valley of Israel and Jordan. The species was first described by Gershom Levy of the Hebrew University of Jerusalem in 2007, though news agencies later reported it in 2010 as a new discovery (with a slightly different spelling) by a team of biologists from the University of Haifa.

Habitat
Cerbalus aravaensis lives in sand dunes, and partly stable sands at the edge of salt marshes. It is nocturnal and is most active in the hotter summer months. It constructs underground dens with hinged, trap-door like operculum made of sand and glue, in order to disguise the entrance from predators.

Conservation
The Sands of Samar, the last remaining sand dunes in the southern Arava region of Israel and home to Cerbalus aravaensis, are disappearing. Mining projects on the sands are intended to be renewed in the near future and thus the habitat's future is uncertain. Should the Sands of Samar be destroyed, it is unlikely that Cerbalus aravaensis would survive.

References

External links

Sparassidae
Spiders of Asia
Spiders described in 2007